Hans Krebs is the name of:

Hans Krebs (SS general) (1888–1947), Austro-Czech legislator
Hans Krebs (Wehrmacht general) (1898–1945), German infantry commander during World War II
Hans Krebs (biochemist) (1900–1981), German-born British physician and biochemist

See also
John Hans Krebs (1926–2014), German-born American legislator and politician
Krebs (surname)